Samuele Marzoli (born 1 March 1984) is an Italian former professional road and track cyclist.

Major results

Road

2005
 2nd Giro della Provincia di Reggio Calabria
 7th Memorial Cimurri
2007
 7th GP Kranj
2008
 1st Coppa Caivano
 3rd Circuito del Porto
 3rd Coppa Colli Briantei Internazionale
 6th Coppa San Geo

Track

2001
 2nd Sprint, European Junior Track Championships
2003
 1st  Scratch, European Under–23 Track Championships
 National Track Championships
1st  Madison (with Marco Villa)
1st  Scratch
2004
 1st Six Days of Fiorenzuola (with Giovanni Lombardi)
 3rd Madison, European Under–23 Track Championships
2005
 2nd Six Days of Fiorenzuola (with Marco Villa
 3rd Madison, European Under–23 Track Championships
2006
 2nd Six Days of Fiorenzuola ( with Marc Hester)

References

External links

1984 births
Living people
Italian male cyclists
People from Fiorenzuola d'Arda
Italian track cyclists
Cyclists from Emilia-Romagna
Sportspeople from the Province of Piacenza